Matisse Thuys (born 24 January 1998) is a Belgian footballer who plays for third tier club Rupel Boom.

Club career
He made his Eerste Divisie debut for MVV Maastricht on 18 August 2017 in a game against Go Ahead Eagles.

References

External links
 

1998 births
Living people
Belgian footballers
Association football midfielders
K.R.C. Genk players
MVV Maastricht players
AS Verbroedering Geel players
URSL Visé players
K. Rupel Boom F.C. players
Eerste Divisie players
Belgian Third Division players
Belgium youth international footballers
Belgian expatriate footballers
Expatriate footballers in the Netherlands
Belgian expatriate sportspeople in the Netherlands